Camille van Mulders (1868 – 1949) was a Belgian still life painter.

Life

van Mulders was born in Brussels in 1868. She studied with the Belgian painters Hubert Bellis and Jean-François Portaels. She focused on flower pieces, working in pastels and oil paints. Mulders exhibited her work in the Woman's Building and the Palace of Fine Arts at the 1893 World's Columbian Exposition in Chicago, Illinois.

She died in 1949.

References

External links

 images of Van Mulders' work on ArtNet

1868 births
1949 deaths
Artists from Brussels
Belgian women painters
Belgian still life painters
19th-century Belgian painters
20th-century Belgian painters
19th-century Belgian women artists
20th-century Belgian women artists